Galipatam (English: Kite) is a 2014 Telugu romantic drama film directed by Naveen Gandhi and produced by Sampath Nandi, Kiran Muppavarapu and Vijayakumar Vattikuti. The film stars Aadi, Erica Fernandes and Kristina Akheeva in the lead roles, with actors Rahul Ravindran and Preethi Rana in other prominent roles. The music has been composed by Bheems Ceciroleo. The film was released on 8 August 2014, which received mixed reviews from critics and audiences.

Plot
 
Karthik and Swathi are a happily married working couple outside the house. They are like friends and fill their responsibilities but not fill love. In a party they reveal that they do not love each other but their past lovers Parineethi and Aarav Reddy, respectively. They both decide to get divorced and go back to their past lovers. Swathi's mother gets a heart attack and the couple decides to pretend to be together. At their anniversary party, swathi's mother reveals that she knows the truth. Few years later, Karthik and Swathi go on a vacation with their kids and respective partners: Karthik & Parineethi and Swathi with Aarav.

Cast
 Aadi as Karthik
 Erica Fernandes as Shwathi, Karthik's wife, Aarav's Lover
 Kristina Akheeva as Parineeti "Paro", Karthik's lover
 Rahul Ravindran as Aarav Reddy
 Bharath Reddy as Ram
 Preethi Rana
 Gayatri Bhargavi as Swetha, wife of Ram
 Chammak Chandra  as Karthik's friend
 Posani Krishna Murali as Lawyer

Production
90% of the film was shot in Hyderabad, Telangana, and remaining was shot near ShadNagar and Chirala, Andhra Pradesh.  The film features a soundtrack with 5 original songs by Bheems Ceciroleo, cinematography by K. Bujji, art direction by D.Y.Satyannarayana, and editing by Rambabu. Filming completed 27 May 2014, and the project moved into post production.

 Galipatam team released their Promotion song on 28 June 2014 which scored tremendous response a wide audience.
 Galipatam audio rights were sold to Aditya Music and launch happened on 12 July.
Galipatam audio was launched on 12 July. Aadi Fans from both the states of Andhra Pradesh and Telangana attended the event. The songs were released by fans selected by best tagline through a contest ran in Facebook. The main guests were Director VV Vinayak, Director Harish Shankar. Trailer was released by Harish Shankar and Audio CD was released by VV Vinayak.
 Galipatam was released on 8 August 2014.

Soundtrack

The soundtrack of the film was composed by Bheems Ceciroleo. The soundtrack album was released on 12 July 2014 in Hyderabad.

References

External links
 
 

2014 films
2014 romantic drama films
Indian romantic drama films
Films scored by Bheems Ceciroleo
Films shot in Hyderabad, India
2010s Telugu-language films